Kagemand or Kagekone (English: Cake man or Cake woman) is a Danish cake in the shape of a boy or a girl, which is traditionally eaten at birthdays and anniversaries. It is a variation of the simpler brunsviger.

The cake is usually made with either a soft yeast dough topped with brown sugar or a Danish pastry dough topped with icing glacé. In any case, the cake is decorated with candy and festive Danish flags. Traditionally, the birthday party starts with the cake figure being decapitated or dismembered, while all the children scream.

References

External links 

 Images of Kagemand from a Danish bakery.

Danish cakes